Linshui County is a county in the east of Sichuan province, China, administratively governed by the prefecture-level city of Guang'an; it is the easternmost county-level division of Guang'an, bordering Chongqing municipality to the east.

The county, which is not large, is accessible via a four-hour shuttle coach riding on the Chengnan expressway from Chengdu (Shiling public bus station) and a two-hour driving from the municipality city Chongqing on the south. The county is rich in natural resources, and has reservoirs of coal and sweet natural gas.

Strategically, Linshui County is on the only path out of Sichuan province in the east, as the connecting point between Dazhou and Chongqing. The local economy is largely dependent on livestock and agricultural farming.

Transportation
Due to the peculiar local terrain—a series of parallel mountain ranges running in the SW to NE direction --, most roads in the area run in the valleys, also in the SW-NE direction. The G65 Baotou–Maoming Expressway runs through Linshui County, but no railway does.

Plans exist for a high speed railway (Dazhou-Chongqing Intercity Railway) that would run from Chongqing to Dazhou, roughly parallel to the older Xiangyang–Chongqing Railway. In early May 2015, Linshui people learned that the railway would be routed (i.e. the valley in which it will run) was to be via Guang'an, hometown of Deng Xiaoping. Tens of thousands of residents marched in protest and were met by violent attacks by local police, including a Special Police Unit team, with two people reported dead. A violent reaction followed and the confrontation lasted all day and well into the night with many police cars damaged.

Climate

Notes

 
County-level divisions of Sichuan
Guang'an